The Campbell-Napier-Railton Blue Bird was a land speed record car driven by Malcolm Campbell.

After Henry Segrave's Golden Arrow, clearly a more powerful engine was required for Blue Bird, with a chassis and transmission to handle it. A supercharged Napier Lion VIID was used, with over three times the power of the previous Blue Bird and a large premium over Golden Arrow's unsupercharged  Lion VIIA. This was not the first use of supercharging for Land Speed Record cars, but was the first combining supercharging with the large displacement aero engines that had previously been relied upon for their gross output.   Golden Arrow's innovative vertical aerodynamic stabilising fin was also used, a first for Campbell.

Campbell's nemesis Segrave was killed in an attempt on the water speed record while Campbell was scouting for new record courses in South Africa. On his return, Campbell set off for Daytona with the new Blue Bird, concerned at American challenges to the record. Segrave had, after all, at least been British. On his return he learned he was to be knighted as Sir Malcolm Campbell. This record stood for another year, until he himself broke it with his next car, the next Rolls-Royce-engined 1933 Blue Bird.

References 

 
  Many rare period photos.

External links
 

Bluebird record-breaking vehicles
Bluebird, Campbell-Napier-Railton
Bluebird, Campbell-Napier-Railton
Bluebird, Campbell-Napier-Railton
Cars powered by aircraft engines